Chaenopsis is a genus of pikeblennies found in the Pacific and Atlantic oceans.

Species
There are currently 10 recognized species in this genus:
 Chaenopsis alepidota (C. H. Gilbert, 1890) (Orangethroat pikeblenny)
 Chaenopsis coheni J. E. Böhlke, 1957 (Cortez pikeblenny)
 Chaenopsis deltarrhis J. E. Böhlke, 1957 (Delta pikeblenny)
 Chaenopsis limbaughi C. R. Robins & J. E. Randall, 1965 (Yellowface pikeblenny)
 Chaenopsis megalops Smith-Vaniz, 2000
 Chaenopsis ocellata Poey, 1865 (Bluethroat pikeblenny)
 Chaenopsis resh C. R. Robins & J. E. Randall, 1965
 Chaenopsis roseola Hastings & Shipp, 1981 (Flecked pikeblenny)
 Chaenopsis schmitti J. E. Böhlke, 1957 (Yellow-mouth pikeblenny)
 Chaenopsis stephensi C. R. Robins & J. E. Randall, 1965

References

 
Chaenopsidae